The women's 200 metre breaststroke competition of the swimming events at the 1975 Pan American Games took place on 22 October. The last Pan American Games champion was Lynn Colella of the United States.

This race consisted of four lengths of the pool, all in breaststroke.

Results
All times are in minutes and seconds.

Heats

Final 
The final was held on October 22.

References

Swimming at the 1975 Pan American Games